12th Joseph Plateau Awards
2005

Best Film: 
 Le bal masqué 
The 12th Joseph Plateau Awards honoured the best Belgian filmmaking of 1997 and 1998.

Winners and nominees

Best Belgian Actor
 Dirk Roofthooft - Hombres complicados
Josse De Pauw - Hombres complicados
Peter Van den Begin - Le bal masqué

Best Belgian Actress
 Pascale Bal - Le bal masqué
Hilde Van Mieghem - Hombres complicados
Francesca Vanthielen - When the Light Comes

Best Belgian Director
 Julien Vrebos - Le bal masqué
Stijn Coninx - When the Light Comes
Dominique Deruddere - Hombres complicados

Best Belgian Film
 Le bal masqué
Hombres complicados
When the Light Comes (Licht)

Box Office Award
 Oesje!

1998 film awards